KCOR-CD, virtual channel 34 (UHF digital channel 27), is a low-power, Class A television station licensed to San Antonio, Texas, United States. It is a translator of Blanco-licensed UniMás owned-and-operated station KNIC-DT (channel 17) which is owned by the Univision Local Media subsidiary of TelevisaUnivision; it is also sister to San Antonio–licensed Univision owned-and-operated station KWEX-DT (channel 41). KCOR-CD's transmitter is located on César E. Chavéz Bouelvard in downtown San Antonio; its parent station shares studios with KWEX-DT on Network Boulevard on the city's northwest side.

History
The station began as a construction permit issued to Clear Channel Communications on March 23, 1988 to build a low-power television station on UHF channel 17 in San Antonio. Given the callsign K17BY, the station went on air in March 1991 and was licensed a month later on April 2, 1991. Also in March 1991, Clear Channel agreed to sell the station to Nicolas Communications, who assumed full control several weeks later. In November 1997, the station took call letters KNIC-LP, named after its owners, and in November 2001, the station upgraded to a Class A license, changing its call letters to KNIC-CA. Also in November, Nicolas Communications and Univision reached an agreement for Univision to buy the station, and the transaction was consummated in January 2002, in time for the launch of Univision's new network, Telefutura. KNIC-CA affiliated with the new network and simulcast its programming on KFTO-LP (now KFTO-CA).

Univision had been an applicant since 2000 for a full-service television station on UHF channel 52 in Blanco, and after winning the auction to build the station, they requested that the FCC change the allocation from channel 52 to channel 17. The FCC granted the request, to be effective in February 2003. In their formal application to build the full-service station, to be called KNIC-TV, Univision declared their intent to either move KNIC-CA to another channel, or to shut it down altogether  (p. 4). In September 2006, with KNIC-TV about to go on-the-air, Univision requested an STA to move KNIC-CA to channel 34. The FCC granted the STA, and KNIC-CA channel 17 went silent on September 28, 2006.

In moving to channel 34, KNIC-CA disrupted plans for digital operations for three other local television stations: KMHZ-LP, KVDF-CA and KEVI-LP. The stations had competing applications to build a low-power digital television facilities on channel 34, but Class A displacements have priority over other low-power applications not caused by displacement. A displacement occurs when a higher-priority station forces a lower-priority station to change its broadcast channel. Full-service KNIC-TV had priority over Class A low-power KNIC-CA, so KNIC-CA was displaced.

The station was licensed for digital operation on channel 34 on June 3, 2015, and changed its call sign to KNIC-CD.

The station changed its call sign to KCOR-CD on April 5, 2019.

Technical information

Subchannels
The station's digital signal is multiplexed:

Analog-to-digital conversion
KNIC-CA was allowed to continue broadcasting its analog signal following February 18, 2009, which was the end of the digital TV conversion period for full-service stations, since it is a licensed low-power Class A station and has certain interference protection rights.

After the 2016–2017 FCC TV spectrum auction, KNIC-CD will need to move from RF channel 34 to RF channel 27 for testing starting in April 2019. The switch is to be complete by June 21, 2019.

References

External links

Television channels and stations established in 1991
UniMás network affiliates
Ion Mystery affiliates
Laff (TV network) affiliates
KCOR-CD
Low-power television stations in the United States
Spanish-language television stations in Texas
1991 establishments in Texas